Jean-Michel Tessier (born 22 December 1977) is a French former cyclist. He rode in the 2000 Giro d'Italia, but did not finish.

Major results

1998
 1st Overall Mi-Août en Bretagne
 1st Six Days of Nouméa (with Robert Sassone)
2000
 1st Stage 1A Tour de l'Ain
 4th Paris–Bourges
2001
 1st Grand Prix de la Ville de Lillers
 1st Six Days of Nouméa (with Robert Sassone)
 1st  National Madison Championships (with Robert Sassone)
 3rd Kampioenschap van Vlaanderen
 6th Overall Circuit de Lorraine
1st Stage 2
2002
 1st Six Days of Nouméa (with Adriano Baffi)
 1st  National Madison Championships (with Robert Sassone)
 1st  National Points Race Championships
 5th Overall Tour du Limousin
 8th Grand Prix d'Isbergues
2003
 1st Six Days of Nouméa (with Robert Sassone)
 7th Grand Prix d'Isbergues
2004
 10th Grand Prix de Denain

References

1977 births
Living people
French male cyclists
People from Nouméa